Nadaprabhu Kempegowda Stn., Majestic is the first Namma Metro interchange station in Bangalore, in the state of Karnataka, India. It opened to the public on 30 April 2016 as part of Namma Metro's Phase-1. Majestic serves as the interchange station allowing passengers to transfer between Purple Line and Green Line. The station is located within walking distance from BMTC & KSRTC's Kempegowda Bus Station, as also the City's Main Railway station.

History

Construction
Construction began in January 2012 and was expected to be completed in 2014, but faced delays due to the hardness of the rock to be excavated, and missed several deadlines. KSRTC, the state inter-city bus transport agency, provided BMRCL with 20 acres of land for construction of the station, slightly over half of which was returned to KSRTC after construction was completed. BMRCL paid KSRTC  annually during the construction period as rent for the land.

BMRCL employed 2,240 engineers, construction workers and others to build the station. Majestic station (and all other underground stations of Namma Metro's Phase-1) was built using the cut-and-cover method. For Majestic station, the rocks were cut by blasting and 10,000 blasts had to be conducted during excavation. BMRCL stated that it had used 300,000 cubic meters of sand (equal to the volume of six football fields) and 100,000 cubic meters of cement to build the station. The underground section of the station includes a rake interchange to transfer trains between Purple and Green Line trains and vice versa.

The station opened to the public on 30 April 2016. Green Line services commenced at the station (at one level below purple line) on 18 June 2017.

Structure

The station has four levels with a total floor surface area of 48,000 square meters (520,000 square feet) and is said to be the largest underground metro station in Asia. The station area covers 7 acres. Purple Line train platform is 365 metres long, Green Line train platform is 300 metres long. It has 12 staircases, 18 escape routes and 24 escalators. The station's platforms are designed to handle 20,000 commuters at any given time.

The surface level houses the entrances. There are four main entrances facing west, north-west, south and east. Pedestrian subways and sky-walks connect the station to the adjacent railway station and the bus termini.

Ticket counters are located on a mezzanine floor. The first underground level has platforms for Purple Line trains and the second underground level has platforms for Green Line trains, perpendicular to those of the platforms for Purple Line trains.

Station layout

Entry/Exits
There are 3 Entry/Exit points – A, B and C. Commuters can use either of the points for their travel.

 Entry/Exit point A: Towards KSR Bengaluru Railway Stn. with wheelchair accessibility
 Entry/Exit point B: Towards Majestic Bus Stand
 Entry/Exit point C: Towards Majestic Bus Stand with Wheelchair accessibility

Connections

Kempegowda Bus Station

City railway station

See also
Bangalore
Kempegowda Bus Station
List of Namma Metro stations
Transport in Karnataka
List of metro systems
List of rapid transit systems in India
Bangalore Metropolitan Transport Corporation

References

External links

 Bangalore Metro Rail Corporation Ltd. (Official site) 
 UrbanRail.Net – descriptions of all metro systems in the world, each with a schematic map showing all stations.
Bangalore Metro Route and Fare Details

Namma Metro stations
Railway stations in India opened in 2016
2016 establishments in Karnataka